Elton Britt (born James Elton Baker; June 27, 1913 – June 22, 1972) was an American country music singer, songwriter, and musician, who was best known for his honky tonk and yodelling songs.

Biography
Britt was born on a farm near Marshall, Arkansas. His father was James Baker, and he had two sisters, Gretta Sanders and Druse Baker, and a brother Arl Baker.

Britt recorded over 600 sides and 60 albums for RCA Victor and other labels in more than a 30-year span, and is best known for such hit songs (several of which he wrote or co-wrote) as "Someday (You'll Want Me to Want You)", "Detour", "Chime Bells", "Maybe I'll Cry Over You", "Pinto Pal", and the million-selling wartime hit "There's a Star-Spangled Banner Waving Somewhere". The recording had sold a million discs by 1944 and it was awarded a gold disc by the RIAA. Britt became the first country artist to be awarded a gold disc.

A singer, bandleader, radio and television performer, songwriter and yodeler, he starred in at least two films in the late 1940s, and had hit records as late as 1968 with "The Jimmie Rodgers Blues". In 1960, as part of a publicity stunt, Britt briefly ran for the Democratic presidential nomination.

On June 22, 1972, five days before his 59th birthday, Britt suffered a heart attack while driving his car and died in a McConnellsburg, Pennsylvania, hospital the next day. He was buried in the Odd Fellows Cemetery in Broad Top, Pennsylvania.

In popular culture
His song "Uranium Fever" is featured in the Bethesda Softworks video game Fallout 4 on the in-game radio.

Discography

Albums

Singles

References

External links
 
 
 

1913 births
1972 deaths
American country singer-songwriters
Singer-songwriters from Arkansas
People from Searcy County, Arkansas
RCA Victor artists
Yodelers
Place of death missing
20th-century American singers
Country musicians from Arkansas
Bluebird Records artists
ABC Records artists